Alticotius de Alticotiis (died 1575) was a Roman Catholic prelate who served as the Bishop of Guardialfiera (1572–1575).

Biography
On 13 August 1572, Alticotius de Alticotiis was appointed by Pope Gregory XIII as Bishop of Guardialfiera.
He served as Bishop of Guardialfiera until his death in 1575

References

External links and additional sources
 (for Chronology of Bishops) 
 (for Chronology of Bishops) 

16th-century Italian Roman Catholic bishops
1575 deaths
Bishops appointed by Pope Gregory XIII